Kim Hye-suk (also known as Kim Hye-sook, born 22 December 1968) is a South Korean sailor. She competed in the women's 470 event at the 1988 Summer Olympics.

References

External links
 
 

1968 births
Living people
South Korean female sailors (sport)
Olympic sailors of South Korea
Sailors at the 1988 Summer Olympics – 470
Asian Games bronze medalists for South Korea
Asian Games medalists in sailing
Sailors at the 1990 Asian Games
Medalists at the 1990 Asian Games
Place of birth missing (living people)